The La Colasal Immaculate Conception is a c.1645-1655 oil on canvas painting by Bartolomé Esteban Murillo in the Museum of Fine Arts of Seville.

References

Paintings in the Museum of Fine Arts of Seville
1640s paintings
1650s paintings
Paintings of the Immaculate Conception by Bartolomé Esteban Murillo
Angels in art
Moon in art